The Cathedral of Our Lady of Arabia is  a Roman Catholic cathedral in Awali, Bahrain, dedicated to Our Lady of Arabia. It serves as the seat of the Apostolic Vicar of Northern Arabia. It was inaugurated on 9 December 2021 by His Majesty King Hamad bin Isa Al Khalifa, the King of Bahrain. It is the largest Catholic church in the Arabian Peninsula.

Masses are conducted in various languages, reflecting the population of expatriates in the country, primarily English but also Arabic, Tagalog, Malayalam and, Konkani.

History 
In a gesture of religious tolerance, On 11 February 2013, His Majesty King Hamad bin Isa bin Salman Al-Khalifa generously donated 9,000 sq.m of land for the cathedral. On May 19, 2014, King Hamad bin Isa bin Salman Al-Khalifa met with Pope Francis at the Apostolic Place in the Vatican and presented a scale model of the largest church that would be built in the Arabian Peninsula, as a symbol of the Kingdom's commitment to tolerance and coexistence.

The construction work began on May 31, 2014, after the Blessing of the Foundation Stone was done. The foundation stone was taken from the Holy Door of the Papal Basilica of St. Peter's in the Vatican and was gifted to the faithful of Arabia as a sign of profound union with the Church of Rome. The ground-breaking ceremony was held on June 10, 2018, in the presence of Msgr. Camillo Ballin, the Papal Nuncio, Msgr. Francisco Padilla, and officials of the Kingdom of Bahrain. Following the demise of Msgr. Camillo Ballin on April 12, 2020, the construction was overseen by Msgr. Paul Hinder, whom Pope Francis appointed as the Apostolic Administrator of Northern Arabia.

The design of the cathedral was created by the Italian designer and architect Mattia Del Prete and Cristiano Rosponi. The shape of the cathedral resembles a "tent" in which the Prophet Moses used to meet God in the Old Testament. The cathedral has a seating capacity of 2300, with two chapels and two large rooms with cubicles for confessions. The roof of the cathedral has an octagonal dome.

In one of the chapels is revealed the patroness of the Apostolic Vicariate of Northern Arabia, "Our Lady of Arabia" – the Virgin Mary seated on a throne with a crown on her head, holding the Baby Jesus in her right hand and the rosary in her left hand. The "mystery crown artworks" in the cathedral are the masterpiece of Kiko Arguello.

It was inaugurated on the morning of Thursday, 9 December 2021, in Bahrain. The ceremony was attended by Sheikh Abdullah bin Hamad Al Khalifa, who represented the King of Bahrain, Hamad bin Isa Al Khalifa. Also in attendance were Msgr. Paul Hinder, the Apostolic Administrator of Northern Arabia, Msgr. Eugene Nugent, the Apostolic Nuncio in Bahrain and Kuwait and, Qatar and Cardinal Luis Antonio Tagle, the Prefect of the Congregation for the Evangelization of Peoples. The next day, on Friday, 10 December 2021, Cardinal Tagle presided over the liturgy for the consecration of the place of worship along with Msgr. Eugene Nugent and Msgr. Paul Hinder.

Papal visit 
On 4 November 2022, Pope Francis made a historic visit to the Cathedral of Our Lady of Arabia in Bahrain. During his visit, the Pope expressed his gratitude to the people of Bahrain for their care for the country's Catholic community. He also addressed the issue of unity in diversity within the Christian community and emphasized the importance of praise and worship in bringing Christians together.

The Pope's visit to the Cathedral of Our Lady of Arabia was significant for several reasons. It was the first time a Pope had visited Bahrain. The visit also served as a symbol of the Catholic Church's commitment to interfaith dialogue and its desire to promote greater unity within the Christian community.

Controversies 

The planned construction of the largest Roman Catholic church in the Gulf was intended to demonstrate Bahrain's traditions of religious tolerance in a region where churches face significant limitations. However, it has become another point of tension in a country already divided Muslim communities. Hardline clerics have opposed the construction of the church complex.

Over 70 clerics signed a petition stating that building churches in the Arabian Peninsula was forbidden. The government ordered the transfer of a prominent cleric, Sheikh Adel Hassan al-Hamad, out of his mosque in response to his opposition, but protests by his supporters forced the government to cancel the order.

More than 50 people have died and hundreds have been detained in nearly 19 months of unrest in the country. The Vatican plans to carve out a new apostolic district covering Kuwait, Bahrain, Qatar, and Saudi Arabia. The new administrative headquarters are expected to shift from Kuwait to Bahrain. Bahrain has a unique tradition of tolerance among different religions, sects, and races, with native Christian, Jewish, and Hindu communities.

References 

Apostolic Vicariate of Northern Arabia
Catholic Church in Bahrain
Roman Catholic churches completed in 2021
Buildings and structures in Bahrain
Churches in Bahrain
Roman Catholic churches in Bahrain
21st-century Roman Catholic church buildings
Catholic Church in the Arabian Peninsula